Truman is a 1997 two-part television documentary film about Harry S. Truman, the 33rd President of the United States. Produced by PBS for The American Experience (now American Experience) documentary program, it recounts Truman's life from childhood to his presidency. Written, co-produced, and directed by David Grubin, the film first aired on PBS in two parts on October 5 and 6, 1997.

In 1998, The American Experience became the inaugural recipient of the Primetime Emmy Award for Outstanding Documentary or Nonfiction Series for Truman.

Interviewees

Charles Babcock, Truman family neighbor
Walt Bodine, journalist
George M. Elsey, administrative assistant to the president
Sue Gentry, editor, The Independence Examiner
Ruth Gruber, Eddie Jacobson family friend
Alonzo Hamby, biographer
Pat Hannegan, daughter of Democratic Party chairman (Robert Hannegan)
Ken Hechler, White House assistant
Vernon Jarrett, journalist
Walter LaFeber, historian
David McCullough, biographer and historian
Victor Reuther, assistant to the president, UAW
Wilbur Sparks, Truman Investigating Committee
McKinley Wooden, Battery D

Home media
Truman was released on DVD by PBS on February 14, 2006. Later, it was also released in an American Experience DVD box set collecting its films about United States presidents on August 26, 2008.

Accolades

References

External links
PBS official site

1997 television films
1997 films
1997 documentary films
American Experience
American documentary television films
Cultural depictions of Harry S. Truman
Documentary films about presidents of the United States
Films directed by David Grubin
1990s English-language films
1990s American films